The Pesio is a  long river in northwestern Italy (Piedmont).

Geography 

The river is a tributary to the river Tanaro, which is a tributary of the river Po. Its source is on the Northern slopes of the Marguareis, the highest summit of the Ligurian Alps. It flows northwards digging the Valle Pesio, which ends in the Po plain near Chiusa di Pesio. The Pesio then follows its course through the plain heading North up to Morozzo, where it gets from the left its main tributary, the Brobbio, and turns NE. Then, with some meander, reaches the Tanaro a couple of km South of Carrù.

Main tributaries

Left side:
 torrente Brobbio, which also collects the waters of the Josina.
Right side:
 torrente Pogliole,
 torrente Branzola.

Notes

See also 

 Natural Park of Marguareis
 List of rivers of Italy

Rivers of the Province of Cuneo
Rivers of Italy
Rivers of the Alps